Derby Pride Academy is an alternative provision secondary free school that opened in September 2012. The school is a joint venture between Derby Moor Academy and Derby County Football Club as part of the Derby Pride Trust.

References

Educational institutions established in 2012
Free schools in England
2012 establishments in England
Alternative schools in England
Secondary schools in Derby